Sleek Rat, the Challenger is a 2013 Chinese wuxia-mystery television drama series based on Tan Ge's (谈歌) 2006 novel The New Legend of Bai Yutang (新白玉堂傳奇). The show stars Xu Honghao as the "Sleek Rat" Bai Yutang, a superb knight-errant during the 11th-century Song dynasty. Many characters come from either the 19th-century novel The Seven Heroes and Five Gallants or the Generals of the Yang Family legends, but the story is completely new.

The series was first broadcast in Malaysia on TVBS-Asia on January 30, 2013, and in Taiwan on March 3, 2013.

Cast and characters
Xu Honghao as Bai Yutang
Zhang Xuan as He Ting
Zhang Pengpeng as Cao Sunü
Liu Xiaojie as Xiaohong
Jordan Chan as Wei Shuaixian
Siqin Gaowa as Mu Guiying
Bao Guo'an as Bao Zheng
Ni Dahong as Chen Zhen
Hou Yong as Song Quan
Yuan Yuan as Sima Ying
Wang Jingsong as Gongsun Ce
Fu Chengpeng as Zhan Zhao
Shang Daqing as Lu Fang
Zhang Shuping as Han Zhang
Yang Dapeng as Xu Qing
Jin Yang as Jiang Ping
He Qiang as Yang Zongbao
Luo Guangxing as Meng Liang
Xiao Guoguang as Jiao Zan

References

Television shows based on The Seven Heroes and Five Gallants
Works based on The Generals of the Yang Family
Television series set in the Liao dynasty
2013 Chinese television series debuts
2013 Chinese television series endings
Mandarin-language television shows
Chinese wuxia television series
Television shows set in Kaifeng